Sanne Vloet (born 10 March 1995) is a Dutch model best known for her appearances in the Victoria's Secret Fashion Show.

Early life 
Sanne Vloet was born in Switzerland to Dutch parents. She grew up, for a time, in Marondera, Zimbabwe,. In the Netherlands, she grew up in Donkerbroek, Ooststellingwerf, Friesland. While auditioning for Holland's Got Talent, she was discovered by a modeling agent at the age of 14. To support her career, her mother would routinely bring her to Amsterdam for her photo-shoots, and seemed to be as enthusiastic about it as Sanne herself. She has one younger brother who is 2 years her junior.  

When she was 15 she applied for a job in a supermarket, but later quit in order to pursue her modeling career. She is fluent in both Dutch and English.

Career 

Vloet started her international career in Paris before moving to New York City and walked for Oscar de la Renta, Rodarte, Jason Wu, Tom Ford, Dolce & Gabbana, Bottega Veneta, Marchesa and Ralph Lauren. Vloet walked in the 2015–2017 Victoria's Secret Fashion Shows in New York City, Paris, and Shanghai respectively.

References 

Living people
1995 births
Dutch female models
People from Ooststellingwerf
Frisians